Operation Oliver is a 2013 project started by the Indian Coast Guard in Odisha. This project was made for the olive ridley sea turtle, an endangered species who migrate to the Gahirmatha Marine Sanctuary.

References

Wildlife conservation in India
Turtle conservation
Indian Coast Guard
Environment of Odisha